Szymon Zgarda (born 30 June 1994) is a Polish footballer who plays as a midfielder for Polonia Środa Wielkopolska.

Club career
Zgarda began his career at Lech Poznań, breaking into the second team at the age of 19. On 1 August 2016, he joined I liga club Miedź Legnica on a season-long loan,. The next day, he made his professional debut, playing the full 90 minutes against Olimpia Grudziądz.

In February 2015, Zgarda joined Widzew Łódź on loan for the remainder of the 2015–16 season. He signed with GKS Bełchatów in July 2015, where he scored 2 goals in 46 league appearances, before moving to Podbeskidzie Bielsko-Biała. His two-year contract at Podbeskidzie was terminated by mutual consent on 27 November 2017.

On 25 January 2018, Zgarda signed a contract with Motor Lublin. In July 2018, he signed one-year deal with Polonia Środa Wielkopolska.

References

External links
 

1994 births
Lech Poznań II players
Lech Poznań players
Miedź Legnica players
Motor Lublin players
Widzew Łódź players
GKS Bełchatów players
Polonia Środa Wielkopolska players
Polish footballers
Association football midfielders
Footballers from Poznań
Living people
I liga players
II liga players
III liga players